The largest mushrooms and conks are the largest known individual fruit bodies. These are known as sporocarps, or, more specifically, basidiocarps and ascocarps for the Basidiomycota and Ascomycota respectively. These fruit bodies have a wide variety of morphologies, ranging from the typical mushroom shape, to brackets (conks), puffballs, cup fungi, stinkhorns, crusts and corals. Many species of fungi, including yeasts, moulds and the fungal component of lichens, do not form fruit bodies in this sense, but can form visible presences such as cankers. Individual fruit bodies need not be individual biological organisms, and extremely large single organisms can be made up of a great many fruit bodies connected by networks of mycelia (including the "humongous fungus", a single specimen of Armillaria solidipes) can cover a very large area.

The largest identified fungal fruit body in the world is a specimen of Phellinus ellipsoideus (formerly Fomitiporia ellipsoidea). The species was discovered in 2008 by Bao-Kai Cui and Yu-Cheng Dai in Fujian Province, China. In 2011, the two of them published details of extremely large fruit body of the species that they had found on Hainan Island.

List

Unidentified specimens
Two large specimens are excluded from the list above. It was sturdy enough to support the weight of two average women.

The second is more speculative. Somewhere in his world travels, writer/naturalist/explorer Ivan T. Sanderson encountered reports of a species of fungi which "weigh a ton, and upheave large trees". The earliest report appears to have been in the writings of James Brooke.

See also

List of world records held by plants
Largest organisms

References

Fruit bodies
Lists of fungi